Windows Identity Foundation (WIF) is a Microsoft software framework for building identity-aware applications. It provides APIs for building ASP.NET or WCF based security token services as well as tools for building claims-aware and federation capable applications.

Windows Identity Foundation is supported on IIS 6/Windows Server 2003, IIS 7/Windows Vista, Windows Server 2008 and Windows 7. Version 1.0 shipped as a standalone product, but the product is now included as a part of Microsoft .NET Framework v4.5.

Major features
WIF has the following major features:
 It allows developers to build claims-aware applications by providing a set of application programming interfaces (APIs) that help developers write code to make access decisions to applications based on claims.
 It provides templates to help developers get started building claims-aware applications.
 It provides utilities that facilitate creation of a trust relationship between a claims-aware application (sometimes referred to as a Relying Party application, or RP), and a Security Token Service (STS).
 It provides a set of ASP.NET controls that help developers create web pages in claims-aware applications.
 It includes a utility that helps developers translate between claims and NT tokens, so that claims-aware applications can be used to access resources that require NT-Token based identity.
 It includes functionality that allows identities to be maintained across multiple service boundaries, and allows delegation of claims.
 It provides tools to help developers build custom security token services using ASP.NET or WCF.

See also
 Claims based identity
 Security Token Service

References

External links

 "Official Name for Geneva"
 "Windows Identity Foundation site"

.NET Framework terminology
Identity management systems